N. S. Parameswaran Pillai or Nadakkal Parameswaran Pillai (1931–2010) is the co-founder of Indian Coffee Houses in Kerala with  T. K. Krishnan.  He is also the author of a history of Indian Coffee House, a worker cooperative.

Historian of I.C.H. movement 
His book 'Coffee Housinte Katha' or 'The Story of Coffee House' is in Malayalam, the regional language of Kerala, the home state of A. K. Gopalan the Communist Leader of India and the father of the ICH movement. He published this work under the pen name, Nadakkal Parameswaran Pillai.
It won Abu Dhabi Shakti Award in 2007.

Early life 
Pillai was born in Pallippuram, a hamlet of Alappuzha in Kerala on 25 May 1931. He was a school drop out after the completion of 4th standard, due to poverty. He engaged in a lot of jobs like Construction Worker, Cook, Bearer in Hotel, Wendor of Peanuts and Pan, Coir Factory Worker, Water Boy in Cochin Harbour, Clerk in Ration Depot, Clerk of Advocate etc. After a long wandering he became a last grade employee on daily wages of Coffee Board's India Coffee House of  Ernakulam in 1945.

Trade Unionist 
In late 1940s he became a trade unionist. He was one of the founders of India Coffee Board Labours Union.  He was the secretary. Later, he has engaged in union activities at Thrissur, Coimbatore, Ootty, Madras and Kottayam also.

Co-operator 
He has deputed to form Worker's Coffee Houses in Kerala by the union. As a result of the initiative of TK and Pillai, cooperative societies of Coffee Board workers were formed at Thrissur and Palakkad. The first Indian Coffee House of Kerala was inaugurated by AKG on 8 March 1958 in Thrissur. Pillai was the Manager cum Counter Clerk. It was the beginning of ICHs in Kerala. 

Pillai guided the ICH movement for three decades. He served the society at Thrissur as Founder Secretary, Sales Manager, Chief Sales Officer and Chief Executive Officer.  He was the Founder Secretary of Palakkad Society too. 
Pillai was also the Director, Deputy Chairman and Chairman of the Federation of ICH societies, New Delhi, the national umbrella organisation comprising all ICH societies of the nation.

Politics 
Pillai became a secret member of undivided Communist Party of India in late 1940s. He became Secretary of Naickanal Branch of CPI. After the division in CPI he became activist of Communist Party of India (Marxist). Posts held by him were Naickanal Branch Secretary, Trichur Town North Branch Secretary and Member of Trichur Town North Local Committee.

Family 
He was married to Smt. K. N. Lalithamma a member of Kattipparambil family of Edappally in Ernakulam District. She is also one of the founder members of ICH Co-operative Society, Thrissur.

They have four children: N. P. Chandrasekharan (Director - News and Current Affairs, Kairali T. V.), N. P. Gireesan (Indian Coffee House), N. P. Murali (Muscat) and N. P. Sunitha, (House Wife). His daughters in law are Girija K.(Information Kerala Mission), Jaya Gireesan and Maya Murali. His son in law is N Ramesh.

Death 
Parameswaran Pillai died on 17 December 2010, aged 79. Because he was an atheist, his body was cremated without religious ceremonies.

References

Coffee Housinte Katha. Published Current Books, Thrissur. .

External links
 Official website

Coffeehouses and cafés in India
Trade unionists from Kerala
Businesspeople from Kerala
1931 births
2010 deaths
People from Alappuzha district
20th-century Indian businesspeople
Communist Party of India (Marxist) politicians from Kerala
20th-century Indian politicians
Indian atheists